Joe's Corsage is a compilation album featuring music recorded by Frank Zappa with The Mothers of Invention in the mid-1960s, before the recording of their debut album Freak Out! (1966). The album was compiled by archivist Joe Travers, and its title is a play on Zappa's 1979 work Joe's Garage.

Overview
A number of the recordings featured on Joe's Corsage are demo versions of songs that would later appear on Freak Out!. The first set of demos, probably recorded in 1965, feature Henry Vestine on guitar, who would later be a member of Canned Heat. Also included are covers of the Righteous Brothers' "My Babe", and Marvin Gaye's "Hitch Hike". The opening and closing tracks are excerpts from an interview with Frank Zappa circa 1967.

Track listing
All tracks by Frank Zappa, except where noted.

Personnel
Frank Zappa – guitar, vocals
Ray Collins – vocals, tambourine, harmonica (tracks 6–8)
Henry Vestine (tracks 2–5) – guitar
Roy Estrada – bass guitar
Jimmy Carl Black – drums

References

External links
Lyrics and details
Joe's Corsage at zappa.com

Compilation albums published posthumously
Frank Zappa compilation albums
The Mothers of Invention albums
2004 compilation albums